OU or Ou or ou may stand for:

Universities

United States
 Oakland University in  Oakland County, Michigan
 Oakwood University in Huntsville, Alabama
 Oglethorpe University in Atlanta, Georgia
 Ohio University in Athens, Ohio
 Olivet University in San Francisco, California
 University of Oklahoma in Norman, Oklahoma

Japan
 Osaka University, a national research university
 Okayama University, a national university
 Onomichi City University, a public university in Hiroshima Prefecture
 Otemae University, a private university in Hyogo Prefecture
 Ohu University, a private university in Fukushima Prefecture

Other countries
 Hong Kong Metropolitan University, Hong Kong, previously the Open University of Hong Kong
 Osnabrück University, Germany
 Open University, United Kingdom
 Open University of Mauritius, Mauritius
 Osmania University, India
 University of Otago, New Zealand
 University of Ottawa, Canada
 University of Oxford, United Kingdom

Language and writing
 Ou (digraph)
 Ou (ligature), the ligature ȣ in the Latin and Greek alphabets
 Uk (Cyrillic), the Cyrillic letter Ꙋ, derived from the ou ligature
OU, an abbreviation for Old Ukrainian, an aspect of the Ruthenian language from the 11th to the 14th century

Surnames
 O (surname), anglicized as Ō, (王), a Japanese family name
 Ou (surname) (區 or 歐), a Chinese family name

Geography
 Nam Ou, a river in Laos
 Ōu (奥羽), a synonym of Tōhoku region, Japan
 Ōu Mountains
 Ōu Main Line
 Ohu University

Organizations
 Croatia Airlines (IATA code OU)
 Orthodox Union (Union of Orthodox Jewish Congregations of America)
 Our Ukraine (political party)

Other uses
 Ōū, a bird (Psittirostra psittacea)
 oculi uterque, Latin for both eyes, in eyeglass prescriptions
 Organizational Unit in computing, particularly in the Lightweight Directory Access Protocol (LDAP)
 Over unity, a phrase related to perpetual motion
 "Overused", in competitive Pokémon tiering
 One Utama, or 1 Utama